The enzyme Rhamnogalacturonan acetylesterase (EC 3.1.1.86, RGAE; systematic name rhamnogalacturonan 2/3-O-acetyl-α-D-galacturonate O-acetylhydrolase) is an enzyme  catalyses the reaction

 Hydrolytic cleavage of 2-O-acetyl- or 3-O-acetyl groups of α-D-galacturonic acid in rhamnogalacturonan I.

References

External links 
 

EC 3.1.1